Birds described in 1887 include African grey flycatcher, crested tit-warbler, scaly-breasted illadopsis, vega gull, Okinawa woodpecker, Ecuadorian cacique, Bornean leafbird, Whitehead's spiderhunter, grey-sided thrush, Slender-tailed woodstar.

Events
Death of Wilhelm von Wright

Publications
Fernando Ferrari-Pérez Catalogue of Animals collected by the Geographical and Exploring commission of the Republic of Mexico 
George Ernest Shelley A Review of the Species of the Family Ploceidae of the Ethiopian Region. Ibis 1887 1-47 continuation
Edward William Nelson Report upon Natural History Collections Made in Alaska between the Years 1877–1881 online
Montague Chamberlain A Catalogue of Canadian Birds

Ongoing events
Osbert Salvin and Frederick DuCane Godman 1879–1904. Biologia Centrali-Americana
Richard Bowdler Sharpe Catalogue of the Birds in the British Museum London, 1874–98.
Anton Reichenow, Jean Cabanis, and other members of the German Ornithologists' Society in Journal für Ornithologie online BHL
Ornis; internationale Zeitschrift für die gesammte Ornithologie.Vienna 1885-1905 online BHL
The Auk online BHL
The Ibis

References

Bird
Birding and ornithology by year